Shahnaz Sohail is a Pakistani former cricketer who played as a batter. She appeared in three One Day Internationals for Pakistan, all on their tour of Australia and New Zealand in 1997. She made her WODI debut against New Zealand on 28 January 1997. Following her playing career, she became the manager of the Pakistan women's team.

References

External links
 
 

Date of birth missing (living people)
Year of birth missing (living people)
Living people
Pakistani women cricketers
Pakistan women One Day International cricketers
Place of birth missing (living people)